Amber Declaration (Lithuanian: Gintarinė deklaracija), also known as Lithuanian Declaration, is a document signed by the representatives of Lithuanian fellowship in Vilnius, Lithuania, Russian Empire, on 7 August 1914, which sought to unify Lutheran Lithuania Minor and Catholic Lithuania Proper into a single autonomous state under the Russian rule. It was officially ratified on 17 August 1914. The Declaration also emphasized the unique Baltic identity of the Lithuanian nation as well as its old tradition of statehood. The authors of the Declaration are Jonas Basanavičius, Stasys Šilingas and Donatas Malinauskas.

The Declaration is named after the proclamation that compared ethnic Lithuania to an amber necklace, which was torn apart due to Germany's historical Drang nach Osten.

Background 

The signing of the declaration was motivated by the geopolitical situation in Europe that began changing at the early stages of World War I. The great powers of the time sought to ensure support from stateless nations to gain an advantage: for instance, the Russian Empire on behalf of Grand Duke Nicholas Nikolaevich sent a manifesto to Poland promising to give them back their land once annexed by Germany and Austria–Hungary and grant them autonomy in exchange for their loyalty and showing “respect to the nations, which were united with you by territory”. Reacting to the political situation unfolding in Russia, the Lithuanian intelligentsia, alongside Estonians, Latvians, Armenians and others, began expressing their interest of gaining some form of autonomy in Russia.

The Lithuanian Declaration sought to secure Lithuania's political interests within the Russian Empire. However, it avoided any direct claims of full sovereignty at the time. According to the memoir written by Martynas Yčas, the document also defended Lithuania's national identity and history by stating the following:The history of Lithuania is a bloody riding-hag of battles with teutonism. Lithuanian nation was the first one, which had to face the Germanic storm raging against Slavism. And in this battle we tied ourselves to Slavism. While we are not Slavs ourselves, we — as bright and flexible amber — blended into the sea of Slavism, bright because our friendship (collaboration) with the Russian nation was never clouded by anything throughout the epoch of independent Lithuania when the Lithuanian nation determined its faith and fulfilled its will in its own right.

The Amber Declaration also vaguely alluded to the Battle of Grunwald as proof of historical unity between Slavs and Balts fighting against a common enemy, encouraged Lithuanians to support the Russian Empire in its struggle against the Central Powers.

References 

1914 in law
1914 in Lithuania
1914 documents